Politics of Mongolia takes place in a framework of a semi-presidential multi-party representative democracy. Executive power is exercised by the Prime Minister, who is the head of government, and the Cabinet. The President is the head of state, but holds limited authority over the executive branch of the government, unlike full presidential republics like the United States. Legislative power is vested in parliament. The Judiciary is independent of the executive and the legislature.

Socialist period and single party government

Shortly after the Mongolian Revolution of 1921, Mongolia adopted a one-party socialist republican constitution modelled after the Soviet Union; only the communist party — the Mongolian People's Revolutionary Party (MPRP) — was officially permitted to function. Mongolian politics was closely monitored and directed by Kremlin. Any political opposition was brutally oppressed, and government officials who opposed the Soviet influence were murdered, executed or sent to labour camps. During the communist regime, collectivisation of livestock, introduction of modern agriculture, limited industrialisation and the urbanisation were carried out without perceptible popular opposition.

Democratic movement
The perestroika in the Soviet Union and the democracy movements across the Eastern Europe had a profound impact in Mongolian politics. On the morning of 10 December 1989, the first open pro-democracy demonstration was held in front of the Youth Cultural Centre in Ulaanbaatar. There, Tsakhiagiin Elbegdorj announced the establishment of the Mongolian Democratic Union.

Over the next months activists, led by 13 leaders, continued to organise demonstrations, rallies, protests and hunger strikes, as well as teachers' and workers' strikes. Activists had growing support from Mongolians, both in the capital and the countryside. Efforts made by trade unions across the country for democracy had a significant impact on the success of the movement. After demonstrations of tens thousands of people in freezing weather in the capital city as well as provincial centres, Mongolian People's Revolutionary Party Politburo gave way to the pressure and entered negotiations with the leaders of the democratic movement. Jambyn Batmönkh, chairman of the Politburo decided to dissolve the Politburo and to resign on 9 March 1990, paving the way for the first multi-party elections in Mongolia. As a result, Mongolia became the first country in Asia to successfully transition into democracy from communist rule.

Multi-party system
As a result of the democratic movement that led to 1990 Democratic Revolution in Mongolia, the constitution was amended, removing reference to the MPRP's role as the leading political force in the country, legalising opposition parties and creating a standing legislative body and the office of president in May 1990.

Mongolia's first multi-party elections for the People's Great Khural (Upper Chamber of the Parliament) were held on 29 July 1990. The MPRP won 85% of the seats. The People's Great Khural first commenced on 3 September and elected a president (MPRP), a vice-president (SDP, Social Democratic Party), a prime minister (MPRP), and 50 members to the Baga Khural (Lower Chamber of the Parliament). The vice president was also the speaker of the Baga Khural. In November 1991, the People's Great Khural began discussion on a new constitution and adopted it on 13 January 1992. The Constitution entered into force on 12 February 1992. In addition to establishing Mongolia as an independent, sovereign republic and guaranteeing a number of rights and freedoms, the new constitution restructured the legislative branch of government, creating a unicameral legislature, the State Great Khural, with 76 members.

The 1992 constitution provided that the president would be directly elected by popular vote rather than by the legislature as before. In June 1993, incumbent Punsalmaagiin Ochirbat won the first direct presidential election, running as the candidate of the democratic opposition.

As the supreme legislative organ, the State Great Khural is empowered to enact and amend laws, regarding domestic and foreign policy, to ratify international agreements, and declare a state of emergency by the constitution. The State Great Khural meets semi-annually. The parliamentary election holds place every four years, but the electoral system varied on each election. The current electoral system is based on plurality-on-large with 29 electoral districts. The Speaker of the State Great Khural is elected by the members of the parliament, and one deputy speaker is appointed by each political party or coalition with at least 10 seats in the parliament.

Political developments
Until June 1996 the predominant party in Mongolia was the Mongolian People's Revolutionary Party (MPRP). The country's President was Punsalmaagiin Ochirbat (Democratic Party) during 1990-1997. Ochirbat was a member of MPRP until 1990 but changed his party membership to Democratic Party following the democratic revolution.

Tsakhiagiin Elbegdorj, as the chairman of the Democratic Party, co-led the Democratic Union Coalition to its first time historic victory in the 1996 parliamentary elections winning 50 out of 76 parliamentary seats. Democratic Union Coalition of Democratic Party and Social Democratic Party (chairman Tsakhiagiin Elbegdorj) was in power in 1996-2000. Mendsaikhany Enkhsaikhan, election manager of Democratic Union Coalition worked as the Prime Minister from 7 July 1996 to 23 April 1998. In 1998, a clause in the constitution was removed that prohibited members of parliament to take cabinet responsibility. Thus on 23 April 1998, the parliament elected (61–6) Elbegdorj, chairman of the Democratic Union Coalition and the Majority Group in parliament as the Prime Minister. Due to opposition MPRP's demand Elbegdorj lost confidence vote at the Parliament and was replaced by Janlavyn Narantsatsralt (Democratic Party) on 9 December 1998. Janlavyn Narantsatsralt worked as the Prime Minister for eight months until his resignation in July 1999. Rinchinnyamyn Amarjargal became Democratic Party's new chairman and served as the Prime Minister from 30 July 1999 to 26 July 2000.

In 1997 Natsagiin Bagabandi (MPRP) was elected as the country's President in 1997 Mongolian presidential election. He was re-elected as President in 2001 Mongolian presidential election and served as the country's President until 2005.

As a result of 2000 parliamentary elections MPRP was back in power in the parliament and the government as well as the presidency.

The vote in the 2004 parliamentary elections was evenly split between the two major political forces – Motherland-Democratic Coalition of Democratic Party and Motherland Party and the MPRP. Thus it required the establishing of the first ever coalition government in Mongolia between the democratic coalition and the MPRP. On 20 August 2004, Elbegdorj became the Prime Minister of Mongolia for the second time leading a grand coalition government.

In 2005 Mongolian presidential election Nambaryn Enkhbayar (MPRP) was elected as the country's President.

The MPRP won a majority (46 of 76 seats) in 2008 parliamentary elections. The Democratic Party won 27 seats with the three remaining seats going to minor parties and an independent. MPRP formed a coalition government with the Democratic Party although MPRP had enough seats to form a government alone in parliament.

On 24 May 2009, in 2009 Mongolian presidential election, Democratic Party candidate Tsakhiagiin Elbegdorj made a victory over incumbent President Nambaryn Enkhbayar. Tsakhiagiin Elbegdorj was sworn into office and became the country's president on 18 June 2009. Elbegdorj is Mongolia's first president to never have been a member of the former communist Mongolian People's Revolutionary Party and the first to obtain a Western education.

In 2010 former communist party Mongolian People's Revolutionary Party reverted its name to its original name, the Mongolian People's Party. After his defeat in 2009 presidential election, Nambaryn Enkhbayar established a new political party and named it Mongolian People's Revolutionary Party after receiving the old name of Mongolian People's Party from the Supreme Court of Mongolia in 2010. Enkhbayar became the chairman of the new party.

In June 2012 the Democratic Party won the 2012 parliamentary elections and became the majority in the parliament. The Democratic Party established a coalition government with Civil Will-Green Party, and Justice Coalition of new MPRP and Mongolian National Democratic Party due to Democratic Party having not enough seats at the parliament to establish a government on its own by law. Members of the parliament were: 35 from Democratic Party, 26 from Mongolian People's Party, 11 from Justice Coalition, 2 from Civil Will-Green Party, and 3 independents.

Incumbent President Tsakhiagiin Elbegdorj, candidate of Democratic Party won the 2013 Mongolian presidential election on 26 June 2013 and was sworn into office for his second term as President of Mongolia on 10 July 2013. Thus, since 2012 the Democratic Party has been in power holding both presidency and government.

Subsequently, in 2016, the party suffered a landslide defeat in that year's parliamentary election, being reduced to only 9 seats, although they would narrowly retain the presidency in the presidential election held in 2017, in which Khaltmaagiin Battulga was elected to succeed Elbegdorj, the outgoing president. Therefore, Mongolia then had divided government, with the Mongolian People's Party having an overwhelming majority in the Khural, while the Democratic Party held the presidency.

On June 24, 2020, Mongolian People's Party was re-elected to the parliament with a landslide victory. Prime Minister Ukhnaagiin Khurelsukh continued to head the cabinet providing government stability and policy certainty.

After Prime Minister Ukhnaagiin Khürelsükh had resigned after protests over the treatment of a coronavirus patient, Luvsannamsrai Oyun-Erdene of MPP became the new prime minister on 27 January 2021. He represented a younger generation of leaders that had studied abroad.

In June 2021, former Prime Minister Ukhnaa Khurelsukh, the candidate of the ruling Mongolian People's Party (MPP), became the country's sixth democratically elected president after winning the presidential election.

In August 2022, Prime Minister Oyun-Erdene made a cabinet reshuffle to get legislative support in pushing his liberalization and privatization agenda forward.

Executive branch

|President
|Ukhnaagiin Khürelsükh
|Mongolian People's Party
|25 June 2021
|-
|Prime Minister
||Luvsannamsrain Oyun-Erdene
|Mongolian People's Party
|27 January 2021
|}

President

The presidential candidates are usually nominated by parties having seats in the State Great Khural. The president is elected by popular vote for a non-repeatable six-year term. The president is the Head of State, Commander-in-Chief of the Armed Forces, and Head of the National Security Council. The constitution empowers the president to propose a prime minister (upon the recommendation by the dominant political party), call for the government's dissolution (the two-thirds majority of vote needed in the State Great Khural), initiate legislation, veto all or parts of a legislation (the State Great Khural can override the veto with a two-thirds majority), and issue decrees (effective with the prime minister's signature). In the absence, incapacity, or resignation of the president, the Speaker of the State Great Khural exercises presidential power until inauguration of a newly elected president. Although the president has limited executive powers, they represent the nation internationally, sign international treaties and conventions and advise the cabinet on important socioeconomic issues. After being elected, the president-elect must give up their party affiliations to act as the "symbol of unity".

In June 2021, former Prime Minister Ukhnaagiin Khurelsukh won the presidential election. He was inaugurated on 25 June 2021.

Cabinet
The Cabinet, headed by the Prime Minister, has a four-year term. The President appoints the Prime Minister after each parliamentary election and appoints the members of the Government on the recommendation of the Prime Minister. If president is not able to reach a consensus with the Prime Minister on the appointment of the Cabinet within a week, the issue is submitted the State Great Khural. Dismissal of the government occurs upon the Prime Minister's resignation, simultaneous resignation of half the cabinet, or after the State Great Khural voted for a motion of censure.

The Prime Minister holds most of the executive powers in Mongolian politics. Unlike the President, the Prime Minister is chosen by the party (or coalition) with the majority of seats in the State Great Khural. Typically, the Prime Minister leads a major political party and generally commands the majority in the State Great Khural.

Structure
The Cabinet consists of the prime minister, the deputy minister, the cabinet secretary and 14 ministers. The government consists of six general function ministries, eight specialised ministries, four agencies for policy arrangement, 23 agencies for policy implementation, four agencies under direct control of the prime minister and five agencies under direct control of the deputy prime minister.

The current prime minister of Mongolia is Mr Luvsannamsrain Oyun-Erdene (Mongolian People's Party). 
Ministries of general function
Ministry of Environment and Tourism
Ministry of Defence
Ministry of Foreign Affairs
Ministry of Treasury
Ministry of Justice and Interior Affairs
Ministry of Labour and Social Protection
Specialised Ministries
Ministry of Construction and Urban Development
Ministry of Education and Science
Ministry of Road and Transport Development
Ministry of Culture
Ministry of Mining and Heavy Industry
Ministry of Food, Agriculture and Light Industry
Ministry of Energy
Ministry of Health
Ministry of Economy and Development
Ministry of Digital Development and Communications
Agencies for Policy Implementation
General Authority for Archives
Mineral Resources and Petroleum Agency
Mongolian Customs
Mongolian Immigration Agency
Agency for Land Management, Geodesy and Cartography
Authority for Family, Child and Youth Development
Fund for Small and Medium-sized Enterprises
Civil Aviation Authority of Mongolia
Agency for Veterinary Medicine
General Authority for Social Insurance
General Authority for Social Welfare and Services
Authority for Intellectual Property
Department for Arts and Culture
General Authority for Taxation
Department for Water
National Geology Agency
General Authority for Border Protection
National Agency for Weather and Environmental Monitoring
National Institute of Forensic Science
General Agency for Court Decision Execution
Department for Medicine and Medical Equipments
General Authority for Health Insurance
Agencies Under Prime Minister
Department for Physical Education and Sports
General Intelligence Agency
Agency for Coordination of Government Properties
State Special Security Department
Agencies Under Deputy Minister
General Authority for Professional Inspection
National Emergency Management Agency
Mongolian Agency for Standard and Metrology
Agency for Government Purchases
Agency for Fair Competition and Consumer Protection

Parliament
The State Great Khural (Ulsyn Ikh Khural in Mongolian, meaning State Great Assembly) is a unicameral legislative body with 76 seats. The State Great Khural wields some of the most important powers in Mongolian politics. Parliamentary elections are held every four years, and 76 representatives are chosen. The current electoral system is based on plurality-at-large with 29 electoral districts across the country. According to the Constitution, every Mongolian citizen over the age of 18 can participate in elections, or run for government offices including the State Great Khural. Although there are several controversies (such as the right to vote of prisoners and Mongolian nationals abroad), the US government-funded agency Freedom House considers Mongolia to be a free representative democracy.

The State Great Khural is charged with the passage of legislation, approval of treaties, confirmation of the Government ministers and hearings of various government officials. Members of the State Great Khural have immunity against court trials, and the right to inspect government documents as an accountability on the Government's activities.

Political parties and elections

Mongolian politics is currently dominated by two major political parties: Mongolian People's Party (160,000 members) and Democratic Party (150,000 members). After the 1990 Democratic Revolution, then-Mongolian People's Revolutionary Party transitioned into a centre-left social democratic party. In 2010, Mongolian People's Revolutionary Party changed its name to Mongolian People's Party along with modifications in the party manifesto and leadership; however, the former president Nambaryn Enkhbayar's faction and other conservative members departed from the party and created a new political party taking the original name, Mongolian People's Revolutionary Party. Since the fall of the Soviet regime, Mongolian People's Party has been able to maintain a high level of support. On the other hand, the Democratic Party was established in 2000, integrating minor political parties established by the leaders of the Democratic Revolution. The Democratic Party is a centre-right political party. In 2011, National Labour Party, a centre-left party, was established as an alternative to the Mongolian People's Party and the Democratic Party and gained a notable support from the populace. In 2020 elections, it was able to obtain a number of seats in both the State Great Khural and municipal councils with hopes to increase its political power in the upcoming elections.

There are 36 political parties recognised by the Supreme Court. However, critics say there is no major ideological differences between the political parties on issues like economic policies and governance.

2017 presidential election

2020 legislative election

In 2020 legislative election, Mongolian People's Party maintained its majority in the parliament.

Legal system
The new constitution empowered a Judicial General Council (JGC) to select all judges and protect their rights. The Supreme Court is the highest judicial body. Justices are nominated by the JGC, confirmed by the State Great Khural and appointed by the President. The Supreme Court is constitutionally empowered to examine all lower court decisions—excluding specialized court rulings—upon appeal and provide official interpretations on all laws except the constitution.

Specialized civil, criminal, and administrative courts exist at all levels and are not subject to Supreme Court supervision. Local authorities—district and city governors—ensure that these courts abide by presidential decrees and SGKh decisions. At the apex of the judicial system is the Constitutional Court of Mongolia, which consists of nine members, including a chairman, appointed for six-year term, whose jurisdiction extends solely over the interpretation of the constitution.

The constitution states that the Judicial branch of the government should be independent of any outside influences and government officials. However, in 2019, the State Great Khural passed a law that allows the National Security Council (composed of speaker of parliament, president and prime minister) to dismiss judges who are "dishonest", effectively removing their immunity that meant to prevent outside interventions to court decisions. Various civil movements, international organisations and prominent individuals (including the former president Tsakhiagiin Elbegdorj) have denounced the decision, but no action was made so far.

Administrative divisions
Mongolia is divided in 21 Aimags (provinces) and one municipality/city (khot): Arkhangai, Bayan-Ölgii, Bayankhongor, Bulgan, Darkhan-Uul, Dornod, Dornogovi, Dundgovi, Govi-Altai, Govisümber, Khentii, Khovd, Khövsgöl, Ömnögovi, Orkhon, Övörkhangai, Selenge, Sükhbaatar, Töv, Uvs, Zavkhan, and the city of Ulaanbaatar.

Local elections are held every four year in all 21 provinces and the capital, electing representatives to municipal councils. After each election, the newly elected municipal councils recommend a governor and their office, and meet semi-annually to discuss issues in their province, recommend and supervise the local government. However, the prime minister has the power to choose provincial governors. Unlike federal republics like Germany and the United States, local governments in Mongolia hold limited authority, and are generally tasked with implementing the central government policies.

On the next lower administrative level, representatives are elected in provincial subdivisions and urban sub-districts in Ulaanbaatar.

The latest municipal elections took place on 15 October 2020. A total of 17149 candidates ran for 8167 seats in provincial and county councils. Mongolian People's Party won a majority in 13 out of 21 provincial councils in Mongolia while the Democratic Party took the remaining eight provinces.

See also
Foreign relations of Mongolia
Flag of Mongolia

Further reading 
 S. Narangerel, Legal System of Mongolia, Interpress, 2004

References

External links
official website of the Office of the President of Mongolia
official website of the Office of the Parliament of Mongolia
official website of the Government of Mongolia

 

bn:মঙ্গোলিয়া#রাজনীতি